List of Administrative Heads of Jervis Bay, Australia

References

Jervis Bay Administrative Heads
Jervis Bay Administrative Heads
Jervis Bay Territory
Jervis Bay